The Velvelettes were an American singing girl group, signed to Motown in the 1960s. Their biggest chart success occurred in 1964, when Norman Whitfield produced "Needle in a Haystack", which peaked at number 45 on the Billboard Hot 100, and number 27 in Canada.

History

Early years and establishment
The group was founded in 1961 by Bertha Barbee-McNeal (June 12, 1940 – December 15, 2022) and Mildred Gill Arbor, students at Western Michigan University. Mildred recruited her younger sister Carolyn (also known as Cal or Caldin), who was in 9th grade, and Cal's friend Betty Kelley, a junior in high school. Bertha recruited her cousin Norma Barbee, a freshman at Flint Junior College. Cal was chosen as the group's lead singer.

A classmate at Western Michigan University, Robert Bullock, was Berry Gordy's nephew, and he encouraged the group to audition for Motown. The group signed to Motown in late 1962 and started recording in January 1963. They recorded at the Hitsville USA studio and "There He Goes" and "That's The Reason Why", produced by William Stevenson, was released as a single via the IPG Records label (Independent Producers Group). The recordings included a young Stevie Wonder playing harmonica. While the group awaited their chance at stardom, they recorded for many producers, some of which were re-recorded by other artists including fellow labelmates Martha and the Vandellas and The Supremes. The Velvelettes were not used to provide backing vocals since Motown already had its in-house backing group, The Andantes.

The Velvelettes got their break chartwise in the spring of 1964 thanks to young producer Norman Whitfield, who produced "Needle in a Haystack" as a single for the group, on Motown's VIP Records imprint. "Needle in a Haystack" peaked at number 45 on the Billboard Hot 100 in mid 1964. The group recorded its follow-up, "He Was Really Sayin' Somethin'", with Whitfield again producing, and spent time on various Motown-sponsored tours as a support act. In September 1964, after recording "Dancing in the Street" earlier in June, Betty Kelley officially left the group to join Martha and the Vandellas, and the quintet became a quartet.

Later years and dissolution
The Velvelettes continued performing, with various members leaving and rejoining, as family matters dictated. By 1967, Gill, Norma and Bertha Barbee-McNeal had decided to devote all of their time to raising their families. Cal recruited two new members for concert performances: future Vandella Sandra Tilley (who was introduced by her friend Abdul Fakir of The Four Tops), and Annette McMillan.

With a song on the charts and a place on several concert tours, an album project was started using songs already recorded. However, with the growing success of other Motown groups such as The Supremes, Motown's attention was diverted and the project was left unfinished. The LP was scheduled for release on Motown's V.I.P. label, as V.I.P 401.

Motown released two additional singles, "Lonely Lonely Girl Am I" and "A Bird in the Hand" on their V.I.P. imprint. Both singles did not reach the same chart levels as their predecessors. The Velvelettes continued to record new material until September 1967, with the Nick Ashford and Valerie Simpson song "Bring Back The Sunshine", which was retitled "Dark Side of the World" when Diana Ross later released a version of the song. The final Velvelettes single release (after an internal label change to Motown's Soul subsidiary) was "These Things Will Keep Me Loving You", which made number 43 on the US R&B Charts. Carolyn Gill began dating Richard Street, lead singer of The Monitors, who later joined The Temptations. Sandra Tilley joined Martha Reeves and the Vandellas, replacing Rosalind Ashford. Gill married Street in November 1969 and he dissuaded her from continuing with the Velvelettes (preferring that his wife care for the home) so Gill decided to break up the group and it disbanded. Tilley retired from show business in the late 1970s, suddenly dying of a brain aneurysm in 1981 at the age of thirty-eight. 

In 1971, "These Things Will Keep Me Loving You" became a hit in the United Kingdom, number 34 on the UK Singles Chart. Despite the new success, the group did not reunite until 1984, following a rare concert appearance by the cousins and the sisters at the request of Barbee-McNeal. Together the Gill sisters and Barbee cousins then went on to re-record their original hits and some new songs for the album One Door Closes for Motorcity Records. The group continues to tour today.

Three decades after the group left Motown, the company released a CD, The Very Best of the Velvelettes, featuring 15 tracks, including four previously unreleased selections. A 19-track CD The Velvelettes: The Best Of was released in the UK in 2001. The 2004 The Velvelettes: The Motown Anthology is a double album with 48 tracks.

In 2006, the Velvelettes contributed to the double CD Masters of Funk, Soul and Blues Present a Soulful Tale of Two Cities. Lamont Dozier, Freda Payne, George Clinton and Bobby Taylor recorded remakes of songs from Philadelphia International Records. The Velvelettes sang "One Of a Kind Love Affair", originally recorded by the Spinners. The other CD featured Jean Carne, Bunny Sigler and Jimmy Ellis.

Founding member Bertha Barbee-McNeal died of colon cancer in hospice in Kalamazoo, Michigan, on December 15, 2022, at the age of 82.

Discography

Singles 

 Their eponymous album was never completed and never saw release
 – Chart positions from Cashbox Magazine

Albums
 1966: The Velvelettes (not completed, scheduled for V.I.P. 401)
 1990: One Door Closes (MOTCLP 43)

Compilations
 1999: The Very Best of the Velvelettes
 2001: The Velvelettes: The Best Of
 2004: The Velvelettes: The Motown Anthology

References

Bibliography

External links
 Girl Group Chronicles: The Velvelettes
 
 

American vocal groups
American soul musical groups
African-American girl groups
Motown artists
Musical groups from Detroit
Musical groups established in 1961
1961 establishments in Michigan
Musical groups disestablished in 1970
1970 disestablishments in Michigan
Singers from Detroit
Female-fronted musical groups